The Lexus RZ is an upcoming battery electric compact luxury crossover SUV from Lexus, a luxury division of Toyota. Built on the e-TNGA platform shared with the Toyota bZ4X/Subaru Solterra, it is the first dedicated battery electric vehicle of the Lexus marque that will be sold worldwide and also the second battery electric model after the ICE-based UX 300e.

History
The RZ was previewed by the LF-Z Electrified concept in March 2021. A prototype RZ was shown in December 2021 during a Toyota press event to announce its future plans for rolling out battery electric models. The production model was unveiled at a press event on April 20, 2022, and it was first shown to the public at Le Volan Cars Meet 2022 Yokohama in late May. The RZ was developed at Toyota's Technical Center Shimoyama.

It will go on sale in 2022 (as the 2023 model year in North America), initially in RZ 450e grade, which is equipped with a standard fully variable "Direct4" all-wheel drive system and optional steer-by-wire technology.

Design

Powertrains

The front motor of the RZ 450e is taken from the front-wheel drive version of the bZ4X, while the rear unit is taken from the all-wheel drive version of the same car, making it quicker than the bZ4X/Solterra. Using the 'DIRECT4' system, front/rear axle torque output can be varied continuously from 100:0 to 0:100; during normal driving, the torque split ranges from 40:60 to 60:40.

The storage battery is identical to the bZ4X/Solterra, with a capacity of 71.4 kWh. The RZ 450e has an estimated range of  under the EPA driving cycle, depending on wheel size. The maximum charging rate is 150 kW. Four levels of regenerative braking are available; the lowest level eliminates regeneration entirely and relies on the mechanical (hydraulic) brake system. According to the RZ 450e chief engineer Takashi Watanabe, this was done to provide a more conventional braking feel.

Steer-by-wire system 
The steer-by-wire system, which Lexus have branded "One Motion Grip" for some markets, comes with a steering yoke and removes the physical connection between the yoke and the steering rack. The position of the yoke is used to drive a motor attached to the steering rack, while a second motor provides feedback to the yoke itself. The effort required to turn the yoke varies in response to driving conditions. Regardless of the situation, the total rotational range of motion is 300 degrees, which removes any need to perform a hand-over-hand movement for which a conventional steering wheel may be more suitable. In a hands-on test, Motor Trend called the yoke "little more than a novelty" but declared the "steering system that minimizes movement by instantly and intuitively adjusting to ever-changing conditions ... [is] a brilliant bit of engineering that could well change driving for the better".

Chassis
The chassis takes advantage of structural adhesives, laser-based welding processes, and high-tensile steel to enhance rigidity and reduce weight; the hood is aluminum and the battery is carried underneath the passenger floor, contributing to the vehicle's low center of gravity. The e-TNGA platform has a fully-independent suspension, with MacPherson struts in front and trailing-arm double-wishbones in the rear.

Styling
Six exterior and three interior colors are available; as an option, the exterior can be painted in a bi-tone finish, with the black "spindle" grill accent extended over the hood and roof. The low hoodline and active grille shutter reduce aerodynamic resistance; in addition, the underbody is dimpled to create minute vortices and a roof spoiler is used to enhance downforce.

References

External links 

 Official press release

RZ
Cars introduced in 2021
Compact sport utility vehicles
Luxury crossover sport utility vehicles
Production electric cars
All-wheel-drive vehicles
Electric concept cars